Stanovoye is a rural locality (a selo) and the administrative center of Stanovlyansky District, Lipetsk Oblast, Russia. Population:

References

Notes

Sources

Rural localities in Lipetsk Oblast